Suryapur is a village in the Kalika Municipality of the Chitwan District in Nepal. (Not to be confused with Suryapur in Gujarat state, also called Surat.)

Populated places in Chitwan District